Smiles of a Summer Night is a 1955 Swedish comedy film written and directed by Ingmar Bergman. It was shown at the 1956 Cannes Film Festival. In 2005, TIME magazine ranked it one of the 100 greatest films since 1923.

The film's plot—which involves some couples who switch partners on a summer night—has been adapted many times, particularly as the theatrical musical A Little Night Music by Stephen Sondheim, Hugh Wheeler and Harold Prince, which opened on Broadway in 1973, and as Woody Allen's film A Midsummer Night's Sex Comedy (1982).

Plot 
The film takes place in Sweden around the turn of the twentieth century. Fredrik Egerman is a middle-aged lawyer married to a 19-year-old beauty, Anne. Their two-year marriage is still unconsummated, due to Anne's reluctance.   Fredrik has a son, Henrik, from his marriage to his late first wife. Henrik is in his early twenties and is studying to be a minister but is currently tormented by his love for his step-mother, who secretly loves him in return. Henrik is distracting himself from his urges by attempting an inconclusive affair with Fredrik's lusty young servant, Petra.

Between his two marriages, Fredrik had an affair with a prominent stage actress, the beautiful Desiree Armfeldt, but she broke off the relationship. Desiree now has a young son named Fredrik, born shortly after her affair with Fredrik Egerman. (It is implied, but never directly stated, that little Fredrik Armfeldt is the son of Fredrik Egerman.) Desiree is now having an affair with an army officer, Count Carl-Magnus Malcolm. The Count's wife, Charlotte, is an old friend of Anne Egerman.

Fredrik goes to see Desiree one night to pour out his marital troubles to her and ask for her help. Fredrik falls into a puddle outside Desiree's house, and Desiree dresses him in the Count's nightshirt. The violently jealous Count shows up and orders Fredrik to leave. After Fredrik goes, the Count and Desiree argue and subsequently decide to part amicably. When the Count returns home, he tells Charlotte about the encounter and orders her to tell Anne Egerman about Fredrik's supposed infidelity (though no infidelity actually occurred). When Charlotte visits Anne, she confesses that she loves the Count despite everything and would do anything to be loved in return.

To solve these woes, Desiree has her mother invite all the characters to her country house for Midsummer Night, the shortest night of the year, a traditional observance in Sweden, when many party-goers stay awake all night until dawn.  Desiree and Charlotte become temporary allies. Henrik and Anne, unexpectedly finding themselves alone together in a bedroom, consummate their relationship and elope with the assistance of Petra and her new lover Frid, another servant. Charlotte then joins Fredrik in the garden pavilion. Learning his wife is with Fredrik, the Count bursts in and challenges Fredrik to a game of Russian roulette.  Fredrik loses but the Count had loaded the revolver with soot so neither party was ever in danger. The Count reunites with his wife, his feelings for her renewed by his jealousy. Desiree comforts Fredrik and he asks her not to leave him. The dilemmas of the four pairs of lovers appear to be happily resolved in the course of a night, said by Frid to have smiled three smiles upon them all.

Cast
 Ulla Jacobsson – Anne Egerman
 Eva Dahlbeck – Desiree Armfeldt
 Harriet Andersson – Petra
 Margit Carlqvist – Countess Charlotte Malcolm
 Gunnar Björnstrand – Fredrik Egerman
 Jarl Kulle – Count Carl-Magnus Malcolm
 Åke Fridell – Frid 
 Björn Bjelfvenstam – Henrik Egerman 
 Naima Wifstrand – Mrs. Armfeldt
 Jullan Kindahl – Beata
 Gull Natorp – Malla
 Birgitta Valberg – Actress
 Bibi Andersson – Actress

Production

Smiles of a Summer Night was filmed on location at Jordberga Castle in Scania and at Svensk Filmindustri's Filmstaden in Råsunda, Stockholm, beginning 28 June 1955 and completed 29 August 1955, as well as two days in November 1955.

Release
The film premiered at the Red Mill cinema in Stockholm on 26 December 1955.

Reception
Smiles of a Summer Night opened to highly positive reviews and is viewed favorably today. The film ranked 6th on Cahiers du Cinéma's Top 10 Films of the Year List in 1956. The film won the Bodil Award for Best European Film in 1957. It was nominated for a BAFTA Award in Best Film From Any Source category in 1957. It has a 100% approval rating on Rotten Tomatoes. In 1996, Smiles of a Summer Night was included in Movieline Magazine's "100 Greatest Foreign Films".  The film was included in film critic Roger Ebert's list of "The Great Movies" in 2012 who gave it four stars out of four. Film critic Pauline Kael called the film "a nearly perfect work" writing "The film is bathed in beauty, removed from the banalities of short skirts and modern-day streets and shops, and removed in time, it draws us closer." In 2012 the film was voted at number twenty on the 25 best Swedish films of all time list by a poll of 50 film critics and academics conducted by film magazine FLM.

When Stanley Cavell saw Smiles of a Summer Night, he was so affected that he returned home and wrote about it the rest of that night. The experience led him to explore the intersection between his field, philosophy, and film.

References

External links
 
 
 
 
 Smiles of a Summer Night an essay by Pauline Kael at the Criterion Collection

1955 films
Swedish comedy films
1950s Swedish-language films
Swedish black-and-white films
1950s sex comedy films
Adultery in films
Films set in the 1890s
Films set in country houses
Films directed by Ingmar Bergman
Films with screenplays by Ingmar Bergman
Films scored by Erik Nordgren
Films shot in Sweden
1955 comedy films
Films set in Sweden
1950s Swedish films